David Bennett may refer to:

Politics and law
 David Bennett (barrister) (born 1941), Australian barrister and former Solicitor-General of Australia
 David Bennett (New Zealand politician) (born 1970), Member of the New Zealand House of Representatives since 2005
 David S. Bennett (1811–1894), U.S. Representative from New York
 David Bennett (Rhode Island politician) (born 1955), member of the Rhode Island House of Representatives

Sports

Association football
 Dave Bennett (footballer, born 1938), Scottish footballer
 Dave Bennett (footballer, born 1939) (1939–2009), English footballer
 Dave Bennett (footballer, born 1959), English footballer
 Dave Bennett (footballer, born 1960), English footballer

Other sports
 David Bennett (American football) (born 1961), American football coach
 Dave Bennett (baseball) (born 1945), American baseball pitcher in 1960s
 David Jeffrey Bennett or Jeff Bennett (baseball) (born 1980), American baseball pitcher in 2000s
 Dave Bennett (hurler) (born 1976), Irish hurler

Other
 Avie Bennett (David Bennett, 1928–2017), Canadian businessman and philanthropist
 David Bennett (consultant) (born 1955), British civil servant
 David Bennett (musician) (1823–1902), Canadian musician
 David Bennett (opera director) (born c. 1963), American opera director
 Dave Bennett (software) (born 1965), chief technology officer, Axway
 David Bennett Sr. (1964–2022), first recipient of a genetically-modified pig heart xenotransplant
 David Michael Bennett (born 1986), guitarist for Steam Powered Giraffe
 David "Pinkfish" Bennett, lead developer of Discworld MUD

See also
 David Bannett (1921–2022), American-Israeli electronics engineer
 David Bennet, 4th Baronet (died 1741), of the Bennet baronets